G. C. Waldrep (born George Calvin Waldrep III; 1968) is an American poet and historian.

Biography
Waldrep was born in South Boston, Virginia. He earned undergraduate and doctoral degrees in history at Harvard University and Duke University, respectively, before receiving an MFA in creative writing from the University of Iowa.

He was visiting professor at Kenyon College, and editor of Kenyon Review.
He currently teaches at Bucknell University, where he directs the Bucknell Seminar for Younger Poets and edits the journal West Branch.  He also serves as Editor-at-Large for The Kenyon Review.

His work has appeared in Poetry, Ploughshares, Boston Review, Beloit Poetry Journal, Colorado Review, Gettysburg Review, New American Writing, American Letters & Commentary, Seneca Review, Tin House, Quarterly West, Octopus, Harper's, Gulf Coast and elsewhere.

He wrote an article about spinoff groups from the Old Order Anabaptist groups that no other scholar had covered and was thus widely received.

In 2010 he was appointed to be the final judge of the Akron Poetry Prize.

In 2012, he co-edited the poetry anthology The Arcadia Project.

He is a member of the Old Order River Brethren.

Awards
 Academy of American Poets
 North Carolina Arts Council
 The PIP Gertrude Stein Award for Innovative Poetry in English
 2001 Illinois Prize for history
 2003 Colorado Prize for Poetry, for Goldbeater's Skin
 2005 Campbell Corner Poetry Prize
 2006 Alice Fay di Castagnola Award, Poetry Society of America
 2007 NEA grant 
 2008 Dorset Prize, for Archicembalo

Bibliography

 
 
 
 
  (collaboration with John Gallaher)
 
 
 

[http://www.typomag.com/issue03/waldrep.html "III. Palm Beach, Florida, 1987"; "IV. Santa Monica, California, 1988"; "XXII. Snow Hill, Maryland, 1989"; "XXIII. Charleston, South Carolina, 1989"; "XLI. Isle of Palms, South Carolina, 1989", Typo Magazine]
"How Water Is Manufactured", Memorious 11
"Canticle for the Second Sunday in Lent", Blackbird, Fall 2003
"What Begins Bitterly Becomes Another Love Poem", Blackbird, Fall 2003
"Apologia Pro Vita Tua", Poetry Daily
"Blazon", NEA
 

Non-Fiction
 
 The New Order Amish and Para-Amish Groups: Spiritual Renewal Within Tradition'', in The Mennonite Quarterly Review 3 (2008), pages 396–426.

References

External links
 Bucknell University faculty webpage

1968 births
Living people
Poets from Virginia
Harvard College alumni
Duke University alumni
University of Iowa alumni
Kenyon College faculty
Bucknell University faculty
21st-century American poets
Harvard Graduate School of Arts and Sciences alumni